Charalambos "Charis" Kyriakou (born 15 October 1989) is a Cypriot footballer who plays as a defender for Indian Super League club East Bengal and the Cyprus national team.

Club career
Kyriakou is an product of the youth academy of Omonia. After spending a short period on loan in Doxa Katokopias in 2011, he returned to Omonia. On 6 July 2014 he became the new captain of Omonia.

East Bengal
In August 2022, Kyriakou was announced as one of the five foreigners signed by East Bengal for the upcoming season.

On 25 August, he made his debut against Rajasthan United in the Durand Cup, which ended in a 0–0 stalemate.

International career
In 2009, Kyriakou represented Cyprus at the under-21 level. On 8 June 2013, he made his first appearance for the Cyprus national team in a FIFA World Cup qualifying match against Switzerland.

Career statistics

Club

International

Honours
AC Omonia
Cypriot Championship: 2010
Cypriot Cup: 2011, 2012
Cyprus FA Shield: 2010, 2012

References

External links
 
 
 

1989 births
Sportspeople from Nicosia
Living people
Cypriot footballers
Cyprus international footballers
Cypriot First Division players
AC Omonia players
Doxa Katokopias FC players
Ethnikos Achna FC players
AEL Limassol players
Association football fullbacks
Cyprus under-21 international footballers